The Crispe (or Crisp) Baronetcy, of Hammersmith in the County of Middlesex, was a title in the Baronetage of England. It was created on 14 April 1665 for the merchant and politician Sir Nicholas Crispe. The title became extinct on the death of the fifth Baronet in 1740.

Tobias Crisp, brother of the first Baronet, was a noted clergyman.

Crispe baronets, of Hammersmith (1665)

Sir Nicholas Crispe, 1st Baronet (c. 1598–1666)
Sir Nicholas Crispe, 2nd Baronet (c. 1643–1698)
Sir John Crispe, 3rd Baronet (c. 1676–1728)
Sir Nicholas Crispe, 4th Baronet (c. 1718–1730)
Sir Charles Crispe, 5th Baronet (c. 1680–1740)

See also
Crisp baronets

References

Extinct baronetcies in the Baronetage of England
1665 establishments in England